Robert Candrea (born 3 February 1995) is a Romanian professional footballer who plays as a midfielder.

On 19 January 2018, he signed a contract with Olimpia Grudziądz, which expired at 1 July 2018.

Honours
ASA Târgu Mureș
Romanian Supercup: 2015

CSM Târgu Mureș
Liga IV – Mureș County: 2018–19

References

External links
 
 

1995 births
Living people
Romanian footballers
Association football midfielders
Liga I players
Liga II players
ASA 2013 Târgu Mureș players
FC Gloria Buzău players
FC Dunărea Călărași players
I liga players
Olimpia Grudziądz players
Romanian expatriate footballers
Romanian expatriate sportspeople in Poland
Expatriate footballers in Poland